The Ministry of Public Works is the cabinet-level administrative office in charge of "planning, directing, controlling and building the public infrastructure, as well as the conservation and management of them" within Chile. It is also responsible for the "management, distribution, use and conservation" of all the water resources within the country. They answer directly to the President of Chile. Since 11 March 2022, the Minister of Public Works is Mr. Juan Carlos García Pérez de Arce.

History 
The office was first created by law of 21 June 1887, under President José Manuel Balmaceda as the Ministry of Industry and Public Works. Since then it has undergone several reorganizations during its history, reflected in its different names:

Ministry of Industry and Public Works 21 June 1887 - 20 May 1910
Ministry of Industry, Public Works and Railroads 20 May 1910 - 19 December 1924
Ministry of Public Works and Roads 19 December 1924 - 21 March 1925
Ministry of Public Works, Commerce and Communication Roads 21 March 1925 - 3 October 1927
Ministry of Foment 3 October 1927 -  21 October 1942
Ministry of Public Works and Communication Roads 21 October 1942 – 1953
Ministry of Public Works 1953 - 13 December 1967
Ministry of Public Works and Transport 13 December 1967 - 8 July 1974
Ministry of Public Works 8 July 1974 – present

Titulars

Ministers of Industry and Public Works

Ministers of Industry, Public Works and Railroads

Ministers of Public Works and Roads

Ministers of Public Works, Commerce and Communication Roads

Ministers of Foment

See also
Foreign relations of Chile

Sources

External links
Official Website of Public Works of Chile  

Public Works
Chile